The Statesville/Monroe Indians was a Minor League Baseball club that played in the Western Carolinas League during the 1969 season. They were a Class A affiliate of the Cleveland Indians, and were managed by former big leaguer Pinky May.

Based originally in Statesville, North Carolina, the Statesville Indians moved to the nearby city of Monroe on June 20, 1969 and finished the year as the Monroe Indians, during what turned out to be the first appearance of an organized baseball team based in Monroe.

The Cleveland Indians' affiliate finished tied for third place in the six-team league at 61-63. After that, the team moved to Sumter, South Carolina to become the Sumter Indians for the 1970 season .

MLB alumni
Mark Ballinger
Rob Belloir
Ed Farmer
Larry Johnson
Tom Kelley

References

Other sources
Johnson, Lloyd; Wolff, Miles (2007). The Encyclopedia of Minor League Baseball. Baseball America.  

Defunct minor league baseball teams
Cleveland Guardians minor league affiliates
Professional baseball teams in North Carolina
1969 establishments in North Carolina
Defunct baseball teams in North Carolina
Baseball teams disestablished in 1969
Baseball teams established in 1969
Defunct Western Carolinas League teams